Mayasan Maru (摩耶山丸) was a Japanese landing craft depot ship used extensively to transport Imperial Japanese Army (IJA) troops during 1943 and 1944. After avoiding damage in seven separate submarine attacks in earlier convoys, she was sunk in the East China Sea by the submarine  on 17 November 1944 while part of Convoy Hi-81. The sinking caused one of the highest maritime casualty counts of World War II. Some 3,536 people died.

Service history
The ship was laid down at the Mitsui shipyard in Tamano on 27 August 1941 as a Type M cargo ship for the Mitsui Line. While still under construction the ship was requisitioned by the Imperial Navy and converted to a Landing Craft Depot Ship. She was fitted with a flight deck above the hull, but no hangar. Launched on 29 June 1942, the ship was completed and commissioned in December 1942.

1943
Her maiden voyage was from Hiroshima to Rabaul and return with convoy B-2 in January 1943. Mayasan Maru made a second voyage with convoy B-2 carrying IJA troops from Pusan to Rabaul in February. She then traveled to Palau in March, Rabaul in April, and Truk in May. She joined convoy 0-603 from Japan to Palau in late August and convoy N-404 from Palau to Rabaul in September. She completed two trips from Palau to Japan in October with convoys FU-202 and FU-302 before joining convoy SA-17 for a trip to Singapore in November.

1944
Mayasan Maru returned to Japan with convoy Q to load the 3rd Battalion of the 119th Infantry Regiment with the 53rd Engineer Regiment, 53rd Signal Regiment, and headquarters of the IJA 53rd Division for transport to Manila with convoy Hi-37. She returned to Japan in February 1944 to load the 1st and 2nd Battalions of the IJA 151st Infantry Regiment with the 53rd Artillery Regiment and the 53rd Reconnaissance Regiment for transport to Singapore in April with convoy HI-57. She traveled from Japan to Manila in May and returned to Japan in June to load the 378th, 379th and 380th Independent Infantry Battalions with other elements of the IJA 58th Independent Mixed Brigade.

Mayasan Maru was attached to convoy Hi-71 carrying Operation Shō reinforcements to the Philippines. Although nearly half of the ships in convoy Hi-71 were torpedoed, Mayasan Maru again avoided damage and returned to Japan with convoy MAMO-02. She then made six trips transporting troops from Pusan to Japan in September and October.

Sinking
Mayasan Maru, as part of Convoy Hi-81, set sail from Imari Bay on 14 November 1944. On board were 4,387 soldiers of the 23rd Division, including the divisional headquarters, artillery and engineer companies. Also aboard was the 24th Sea Raiding Battalion with Maru-Ni explosive motorboats, 740 replacements for the Southern Army, 88 Army communications school graduates, various specialists in artillery, communications, engineering, ordnance and transport, and 204 horses.

The escorts rescued about 1,300 men.

See also 
List by death toll of ships sunk by submarines

References

External links 
 

1942 ships
Ships sunk by American submarines
World War II shipwrecks in the East China Sea
Maritime incidents in November 1944
Ships built by Mitsui Engineering and Shipbuilding